Wellen is a municipality located in the Belgian province of Limburg. On 1 January 2018, Wellen had a total population of 7,402. The total area is 26.72 km², giving a population density of 266 inhabitants per km2.

The municipality consists of the following sub-municipalities: Wellen, Berlingen, Herten and Ulbeek. Other population centres and hamlets include: Bos, Beurs, Kukkelberg, Langenakker, Oetersloven, Overbroek, Russelt, and Vrolingen.

History 

Archaeological findings suggest the place was inhabited already during the Frankish period (5th to 7th century). Debris from the river Herk on that spot made fertile soil for farming. Mention of the name Wellene or Welnis doesn't occur until the second half of the 12th.

The name Wellen derives from the Middle Dutch "wellene", meaning "source" or "pit" or, alternately, from Latin terra Villina, "agricultural holding". Wellen was long associated with the abbey of Munsterbilzen, founded around 670.

References

External links
 
 

 
Municipalities of Limburg (Belgium)